The 1903–04 season was the first season of competitive association football in the history of Plymouth Argyle Football Club, an English football club based in Plymouth, Devon.

Background

Review

September

October

November

December

January

February

March

April

Summary and aftermath

Match details

Southern League First Division

Western League First Division

FA Cup

League tables

Squad statistics

See also
List of Plymouth Argyle F.C. seasons

References
General

Specific

Plymouth Argyle F.C. seasons
Plymouth Argyle